James Henry Oughton, Jr. (May 14, 1913–June 11, 1996) was an American businessman, farmer, and politician.

Oughton was born in Chicago, Illinois. He lived in Dwight, Illinois for most of his life. Oughton went to the Dwight public schools and to Phillips Exeter Academy. He graduated from Dartmouth College in 1938. Oughton served in the United States Navy during World War II. After the war, he raised a family with his wife, Jane Boyce Oughton, a granddaughter of Boy Scouts of America founder William D. Boyce Oughton served as the last administrator of the Keeley Institute in Dwight, Illinois for thirty years until the institute closed in 1965. Oughton was a farmer and was involved with the banking business, served on the Dwight school board, and was a Republican. Oughton served in the Illinois House of Representatives in 1965 and 1966. Oughton died at the Riverside Medical Center in Kankakee, Illinois.

Oughton was the father of Diana Oughton of the underground organization Weathermen and had three other daughters.

Notes

External links

1913 births
1996 deaths
Politicians from Chicago
People from Dwight, Illinois
Military personnel from Illinois
Businesspeople from Illinois
Farmers from Illinois
Phillips Exeter Academy alumni
Dartmouth College alumni
School board members in Illinois
Republican Party members of the Illinois House of Representatives
20th-century American politicians
20th-century American businesspeople